The pound was the currency of Zambia from independence in 1964 until decimalization on January 16, 1968. It was subdivided into 20 shillings, each of 12 pence.

History

The Zambian pound replaced the Rhodesia and Nyasaland pound at par. It was pegged 1:1 to sterling and was replaced by the kwacha at a rate of £1 = ZK2 or ZK1 = 10/–.

Coins

In 1964, cupro-nickel 6d, 1/– and 2/– coins were introduced, followed by a 5/– coin in 1965, and holed, bronze 1d coins in 1966.

Banknotes

In 1964, the Bank of Zambia introduced notes in denominations of 10/–, £1 and £5.

References

External links

Currencies of Africa
Currencies of the Commonwealth of Nations
History of Zambia
Modern obsolete currencies
1964 establishments in Zambia
1968 disestablishments in Zambia
Currencies of Zambia
1960s economic history